K. Beichhua is an Indian politician and retired surgeon. He is a member of the former Mizo National Front (MNF), and currently serves as the member of the Mizoram Legislative Assembly for Saiha. He is former Minister of state in Government of Mizoram as Minister for Social Welfare, Excise & Narcotics & Sericulture department.

Early life
Beichhua was born on 19 December 1966 in the village of Thingsen in the Siaha district of Mizoram. His father was K. Thachho. Beichhua graduated with an MBBS from the Regional Medical College in Imphal, Manipur in 1991. He then began working as a general practitioner. Beichhua has stated that he has performed hundreds of operations in his career.

Political career
Beichhua contested the 2008 state elections from Saiha constituency as an independent candidate. He placed third in the election with 23.30% of the vote, behind the Indian National Congress and MNF candidates. He joined the MNF in 2013 and successfully contested the 2013 elections from Saiha. Beichhua received 49.62% of the votes, defeating the incumbent State Industries and Tourism Minister S. Hiato by a margin of 222 votes. After winning the election, Beichhua quit his medical practice. He performed his last surgery in December 2013. Beichhua was reelected from the Saiha constituency in the 2018 elections.

Beichhua performed an emergency surgery on a female constituent at the Saiha Civil Hospital on 22 February 2017. Beichhua chose to perform the surgery himself after he was informed that the woman had developed complications, and the hospital's only surgeon was away attending a training programme in Imphal. Beichhua stated, "I was informed that a 35-year old woman was having severe abdominal pain and needed to be operated immediately. The woman's stomach had a large perforation and if the operation had not been performed, she may have died."

Personal life
Beichhua is married to Zochhuanawmin, who is also a doctor.

Beichhua declared his total net worth to be  in his affidavit to the Election Commission ahead of the 2013 election.

References

External links
Profile on Mizoram Assembly website

1966 births
Living people
Mizo National Front politicians
Mizoram MLAs 2013–2018
Mizoram MLAs 2018–2023
Mizo people